SipHash is an add–rotate–xor (ARX) based family of pseudorandom functions created by Jean-Philippe Aumasson and Daniel J. Bernstein in 2012, in response to a spate of "hash flooding" denial-of-service attacks (HashDoS) in late 2011.

Although designed for use as a hash function to ensure security, SipHash is fundamentally different from cryptographic hash functions like SHA in that it is only suitable as a message authentication code: a keyed hash function like HMAC.  That is, SHA is designed so that it is difficult for an attacker to find two messages X and Y such that SHA(X) = SHA(Y), even though anyone may compute SHA(X).  SipHash instead guarantees that, having seen Xi and SipHash(Xi, k), an attacker who does not know the key k cannot find (any information about) k or SipHash(Y, k) for any message Y ∉ {Xi} which they have not seen before.

Overview

SipHash computes a 64-bit message authentication code from a variable-length message and 128-bit secret key. It was designed to be efficient even for short inputs, with performance comparable to non-cryptographic hash functions, such as CityHash,
this can be used to prevent denial-of-service attacks  against hash tables ("hash flooding"), or to authenticate network packets.  A variant was later added which produces a 128-bit result.

An unkeyed hash function such as SHA is only collision-resistant if the entire output is used.  If used to generate a small output, such as an index into a hash table of practical size, then no algorithm can prevent collisions; an attacker need only make as many attempts as there are possible outputs.

For example, suppose a network server is designed to be able to handle up to a million requests at once.  It keeps track of incoming requests in a hash table with two million entries, using a hash function to map identifying information from each request to one of the two million possible table entries.  An attacker who knows the hash function need only feed it arbitrary inputs; one out of two million will have a specific hash value.  If the attacker now sends a few hundred requests all chosen to have the same hash value to the server, that will produce a large number of hash collisions, slowing (or possibly stopping) the server with an effect similar to a packet flood of many million requests.

By using a key unknown to the attacker, a keyed hash function like SipHash prevents this sort of attack.  While it is possible to add a key to an unkeyed hash function (HMAC is a popular technique), SipHash is much more efficient.

Functions in SipHash family are specified as SipHash-c-d, where c is the number of rounds per message block and d is the number of finalization rounds. The recommended parameters are SipHash-2-4 for best performance, and SipHash-4-8 for conservative security. A few languages use Siphash-1-3 for performance at the risk of yet-unknown DoS attacks.

The reference implementation was released as public domain software under the CC0.

Usage

SipHash is used in hash table implementations of various software:

 Haskell
 Linux
 Node.js
 OpenBSD
 OpenDNS
 Perl 5 (available as a compile-time option)
 Python (starting in version 3.4)
 Raku
 Ruby
 Rust (SipHash 1-3)
 Swift
 systemd
 V8 (JavaScript engine) (available as a compile-time option)

The following programs use SipHash in other ways:

 Bitcoin for short transaction IDs
 Bloomberg BDE as a C++ object hasher
 IPFS for its seven Bloom filter hashes

Implementations

 C (Public domain reference implementation)
 C#
 Crypto++
 Go
 Haskell
 JavaScript
 PicoLisp
 Rust
 Swift
 Verilog
 VHDL

See also
 Bloom filter (application for fast hashes) 
 Cryptographic hash function
 Hash function
 Message authentication code
 List of hash functions

References

External links
 
 
 
 
  – describes when SipHash is not fast enough

Hash functions
Public-domain software with source code
Creative Commons-licensed works